"Spies Like Us" is the title song to the 1985 Warner Bros. motion picture of the same name, starring Chevy Chase, Dan Aykroyd, and Donna Dixon. It was written and performed by Paul McCartney, and reached #7 on the Billboard singles chart in early 1986, making it McCartney's last US top ten hit until 2015's "FourFiveSeconds". It also reached #13 in the UK.

Recording and release
Multiple releases were issued in the UK: a regular 7" single, a 7" shaped picture disc, a regular 12" single featuring extended mixes and the B-side "My Carnival" (a Wings track from the Venus and Mars sessions) and a 12" picture disc.

The minute-long outro is uptempo while the title is being sung repeatedly.  When the movie Spies Like Us hit the theaters, producers opted to play the outro first in the closing credits before playing the entire song.

"Spies Like Us" was released on CD in 1993, as part of the release of The Paul McCartney Collection, as a bonus track on the album Press to Play. The B-side, "My Carnival", was released as a bonus track on Venus and Mars, and the 12" single was an exclusive to iTunes. The "Alternative Mix" was included on the deluxe edition of the Art of Noise album In No Sense? Nonsense! released in 2018. It was also included on The 7" Singles Box in 2022.

Reception
Cash Box said that it is "playful and danceable" with "innate tunefulness," "an ambitious arrangement and a classic resonant and melodic verse line are highlights."

Director of the film John Landis has stated that he though it was "a terrible song", but couldn't say no to McCartney and Warner Bros.

Music video
The video for the song, directed by John Landis (who also directed the film), was not aired by the BBC because Dan Aykroyd and Chevy Chase appeared in it playing instruments. British labour rules at the time prohibited non-musicians from performing in videos, and Aykroyd and Chase did not actually play on the record, though both have worked as professional musicians. The video ends with McCartney, Chase, and Aykroyd walking across Abbey Road, parodying the famous album cover.

The video was however played on the long running BBC show Top of the Pops on 2 January 1986 having already briefly featured in its Top 40 Breakers section during December 1985.

McCartney, the song, and its associated film were all referenced in the Self song "Out With a Bang".

Track listings
7" single (R 6118)
 "Spies Like Us" – 4:40 
 "My Carnival" – 3:56
 Performed by Paul McCartney & Wings

12" single (12R 6118)
 "Spies Like Us" (Party Mix) – 7:10
 Remix by John Potoker
 "Spies Like Us" (Alternative Mix – Known To His Friends As "Tom") – 3:56
 Remix by Art of Noise
 "Spies Like Us" (DJ Version) – 3:46
 "My Carnival (Party Mix)" – 6:00
 Remix by Gary Langan

Charts

Personnel
Spies Like Us
Paul McCartney – vocals, bass, electric guitar, drums,  keyboards, percussion, tambourine
Eddie Rayner – synthesizers
Eric Stewart – backing vocals
Kate Robbins – backing vocals
Ruby James – backing vocals
Linda McCartney – backing vocals

My Carnival
Paul McCartney – vocals, piano
Linda McCartney – organ, vocals
Denny Laine – bass, vocals
Jimmy McCulloch – guitars, vocals
Joe English – drums, percussion
Benny Spellman – vocals
The Meters – vocals

References

Songs about spies
1985 singles
Capitol Records singles
Music published by MPL Music Publishing
Music videos directed by John Landis
Parlophone singles
Paul McCartney songs
Song recordings produced by Hugh Padgham
Song recordings produced by Paul McCartney
Song recordings produced by Phil Ramone
Songs written by Paul McCartney
Songs written for films
1984 songs